Ryan Joseph Campbell-Gordon (born 2 May 2001) is an English professional footballer who plays as a left-back for  club Hanley Town.

He made his debut in the English Football League for Port Vale in August 2019. He had loan spells at Ilkeston Town, Kidsgrove Athletic, Hednesford Town and Gainsborough Trinity, before joining Hanley Town after being released in summer 2021. He helped Hanley to win the Midland League Premier Division title at the end of the 2021–22 season.

Career

Port Vale
Campbell-Gordon came through the Port Vale youth-team and won the club's Youth Team Player of the Year award for the 2018–19 season. He signed his first professional contract with the club in May 2019, tying him with the "Valiants" until summer 2021. The next month he was highlighted as an 'outstanding candidate' by the League Football Education, as he "met with some challenging situations in the local community" and spent six months of his childhood without a school before being accepted into the Ormiston Horizon Academy in Chell and going on to achieve a BTEC Level 3 Diploma. He made his debut in senior football on 24 August 2019, coming on as a 78th-minute substitute for David Worrall in a 5–2 defeat at Grimsby Town. On 14 September, he joined Northern Premier League Division One South East side Ilkeston Town on a one-month loan. On 29 February 2020, he returned to the Northern Premier League Division One South East on loan at Kidsgrove Athletic.

In September 2020, he joined Hednesford Town on a one-month loan deal. He made three Southern League Premier Division Central appearances for the "Pitmen" and also played a game in the qualification rounds of the FA Cup. On 27 October, he joined Northern Premier League Premier Division side Gainsborough Trinity on loan. He played three games for the "Holy Blues" before the Northern Premier League was suspended due to restrictions put in place because of the COVID-19 pandemic in England. He did not feature throughout the 2020–21 season and was released by new manager Darrell Clarke in May 2021.

Hanley Town
On 15 June 2021, Campbell-Gordon he was revealed to be signing for Midland League Premier Division club Hanley Town; he shared the same agent with manager Carl Dickinson and had been coached by assistant manager Dave Kevan at Port Vale. Hanley won promotion as champions of the Midland League Premier Division at the end of the 2021–22 season.

Style of play
Campbell-Gordon was described by Port Vale youth-team coach Mick Ede as "a modern day full back", boasting good athletic and attacking abilities.

Career statistics

Honours
Hanley Town
Midland League Premier Division: 2021–22

References

2001 births
Living people
Footballers from Nottingham
English footballers
Black British sportspeople
Association football fullbacks
Port Vale F.C. players
Ilkeston Town F.C. players
Kidsgrove Athletic F.C. players
Hednesford Town F.C. players
Gainsborough Trinity F.C. players
Hanley Town F.C. players
English Football League players
Northern Premier League players
Southern Football League players